Thomas Lange (born 27 February 1964) is a German rower who won two gold and one bronze Olympic medals in the single sculls.

Lange is one of six rowers (along with Mahé Drysdale, Pertti Karppinen, Peter-Michael Kolbe, Ondřej Synek and Vyacheslav Ivanov) to win medals in the single sculls in three different Olympics.

His first international appearance was at the 1980 World Rowing Junior Championships, where he won the gold medal in the double sculls (2x). He then went on to win the singles title in the next two Junior World Championships.

He first competed at the senior level in 1983, and at the age of 19, won the double sculls at the World Rowing Championships with Uwe Heppner, which they repeated in 1985. Lange and Heppner would have been the favorites for the 1984 Summer Olympics in Los Angeles, but East Germany chose to boycott the games.

In 1986, Lange changed to the single sculls. However, illness prevented him from competing that year. He recovered by 1987 and won his first World Championship in the single sculls besting Pertti Karppinen and Peter-Michael Kolbe who between then had won 10 of the previous 12 World and Olympic titles. Lange repeated this feat by winning the 1988 Summer Olympics in Seoul. In 1989 he again won the World Championship.

By that time East Germany was disintegrating and Lange began his studies as a medical doctor. His father was a member of the Stasi and committed suicide. Despite his demanding schedule and the emotional angst of his country's disintegration, in 1990, with Stefan Ullrich, Lange won a silver medal in the double sculls at the world championships.

In 1991, representing the unified Germany, Lange again won the world title in the single sculls.  At the 1992 Summer Olympics in Barcelona, Lange was a repeat winner in the single. For Lange, this was his fifth straight (non-consecutive) World Championship or Olympic victory in the single sculls.

Lange would go on to take third at the 1993 World championships, take 1994 off to concentrate on his medical studies, finish out of the running in the 1995 World Championships, and come back to claim a bronze medal at the 1996 Summer Olympics behind Switzerland's Xeno Müller and Canada's Derek Porter.

In October 1986, he was awarded a Patriotic Order of Merit in gold (first class) for his sporting success. In 1997, Lange was awarded the Thomas Keller Medal for outstanding career in rowing. Currently Lange works a medical doctor in Ratzeburg.

References

1964 births
East German male rowers
German male rowers
Rowers at the 1988 Summer Olympics
Rowers at the 1992 Summer Olympics
Rowers at the 1996 Summer Olympics
Olympic rowers of East Germany
Olympic rowers of Germany
Medalists at the 1988 Summer Olympics
Medalists at the 1992 Summer Olympics
Medalists at the 1996 Summer Olympics
Olympic medalists in rowing
Olympic gold medalists for East Germany
Olympic gold medalists for Germany
Olympic bronze medalists for Germany
People from Eisleben
Living people
World Rowing Championships medalists for East Germany
World Rowing Championships medalists for Germany
Thomas Keller Medal recipients
Recipients of the Patriotic Order of Merit in gold
Recipients of the Order of Merit of the Free State of Saxony
Sportspeople from Saxony-Anhalt